Darnum is a town in West Gippsland, Victoria, Australia, located 110 km east of Melbourne and a short distance to Warragul, in the Shire of Baw Baw. It is nestled between the Great Dividing Range and Strzelecki Ranges. The Moe River meanders through the edge of the township which the historic Darnum Butter Factory overlooks.

The town's name comes from a word for "parrot", specifically, Rosella in the local indigenous Boonwurrung language.

The post office opened on 1 December 1882 after the arrival of the railway.

Darnum was originally a timber producing town and boasts a large stump in memory of the original timber mill's owner Clarrie Weir. Today the principal industry is dairy farming, with Fonterra, previously Bonlac Foods, operating a milk processing plant just north of town.

Between 1981 and 2017, Darnum was also home to the Darnum Musical Village. A large and important collection of musical instruments, where concerts and events were held. Visitors could play some of the exhibits as tour guides explain the history of different pieces.

The town in conjunction with neighbouring township Nilma has an Australian Rules football team competing in the Ellinbank & District Football League. Mal Michael is a notable player for the team.

References

External links
Darnum Musical Village
Bonlac Foods
Australian Places - Darnum

Towns in Victoria (Australia)
Shire of Baw Baw